Ashley Grace (née Hinshaw; born December 11, 1988) is an American actress and model. She is known for her leading role in the 2012 film About Cherry, and for her role in the 2016 Crackle television series StartUp.

Early life 
Ashley Hinshaw was born in La Porte, Indiana to Chris and Craig Hinshaw. Since the age of nine, she auditioned and participated in several children's plays and youth theatre. Hinshaw began modeling in her local hometown pageant (Miss Maple City Pageant and Talent Competition) at the age of 13, where she won on beauty and photogenic for 13- to 16-year-olds and talent for 8- to 14-year-olds. In 2003 Hinshaw won third in the Queen's Court competition and second in photogenic competition in the Miss Indiana American Junior Teen Pageant. Hinshaw then went on to participate in the National Miss American Coed Pageant for the Miss American Junior Teen category at the age of 14. When she was 16, Hinshaw moved to New York for her modeling career.

Career 
Hinshaw first started modeling in pageants in 2002, where she participated in the Miss Indiana Junior Teen competition. As a model, Hinshaw has appeared in an advertising campaign for Abercrombie & Fitch. Her experience as a model led to her judging a beauty pageant on the MTV reality TV series Made in 2008. A year later Hinshaw pursued an acting career and landed a guest stint on The CW Teen Drama series Gossip Girl as herself. Hinshaw auditioned for a role in the proposed spin-off series to Gossip Girl, Valley Girls which The CW did not pick up. Hinshaw has since appeared in guest roles on Fringe and The Glades. 

In June 2010, Hinshaw was confirmed to star in the high school comedy film LOL, an American remake of the 2008 French film, playing the role of Emily. Production began in August 2010 in Paris and Grosse Pointe, and the film was released on a limited basis in the United States in May 2012. In November 2010, Hinshaw was announced as a star in the independent thriller film Rites of Passage alongside Christian Slater. The film was released straight to DVD on October 16, 2012.

In May 2011, Hinshaw was cast as the lead in the independent drama film About Cherry alongside Heather Graham, James Franco and Dev Patel. Hinshaw portrays Angelina, a troubled young woman who comes to San Francisco and joins the porn industry. Filming began in July 2011, and the film premiered at the 2012 Berlin International Film Festival. In 2011, Hinshaw joined the cast of the superhero film Chronicle (2012). She played Casey Letter, a blogger who regularly carries her camera with her.

Hinshaw appeared in six of the ten episodes of the first season of the 2016 Crackle web series StartUp. Since 2017, Hinshaw has been credited using her married name Ashley Grace.

From 2017 to 2018, she recurred on the E! drama series The Arrangement in the recurring role of Lisbeth. In 2018 she wrote and directed her first short, titled Hunter Gatherer, a socially conscious dramatic piece.

Personal life
Hinshaw started dating actor Topher Grace in January 2014, and they became engaged in January 2015. On May 29, 2016, Grace and Hinshaw married near Santa Barbara, California. On August 1, 2017, Hinshaw confirmed that she and Grace were expecting their first child; their daughter was born in November 2017. On January 5, 2020, Hinshaw confirmed that she and Grace were expecting their second child together; their child was born in 2020.

Filmography

Film

Television

References

External links

1988 births
Living people
People from La Porte, Indiana
Actresses from Indiana
21st-century American actresses
Female models from Indiana
American film actresses
American television actresses